Anthony Joshua vs Jermaine Franklin, billed as New Dawn is an upcoming heavyweight boxing match contested between former two-time unified heavyweight champion Anthony Joshua and Jermaine Franklin.
The bout will be held at the O2 Arena in Greenwich, London.

Background
Anthony Joshua has lost his last two fights, both against Oleksandr Usyk. Jermaine Franklin suffered the first lost of his professional career to Dillian Whyte, although the decision of that fight was controversial with many scoring the fight as a draw or for Franklin winning.

Anthony Joshua had negotiated with Tyson Fury for a bout in November or December, however the fight never came to fruition due to sponsorship issues, with Fury instead choosing to fight Derek Chisora. Joshua is now scheduled to fight Franklin as the first bout of his multi-fight deal with DAZN.

Fight card

References

2023 in boxing
2023 in British sport
April 2023 sports events in the United Kingdom
2023 sports events in London
International sports competitions in London
Pay-per-view boxing matches
Boxing matches involving Anthony Joshua